Lallianzuala Chhangte (born 8 June 1997) is an Indian professional footballer who plays as a winger for Indian Super League club Mumbai City and the India national team.

Career

Youth career
Lallianzuala was picked up by DSK Shivajians's Liverpool International Football Academy in 2014 to play for their under-18 team's debut season in the 2014-15 I-League U19 season. He finished the season as the top scorer in the league with 16 goals and helped his team qualify for the final round, where they finished in the 7th position. Impressed with his form, India U19's coach Lee Johnson called him up to represent the AIFF in the 2015 Asia U18 Champions Trophy, where the team reached the semi finals before losing to Japan's Kashima Antlers over two legs. He was retained by DSK to play in the re-formatted 2015–16 I-League U18, where he helped his team qualify for the final round again with 9 goals in his name from the Maharashtra zone. DSK finished 3rd in the final round of the playoffs, where he scored 2 more goals, thus taking his tally to 11 for the season.

In March 2016, Lallianzuala along with his club teammate, Jerry Mawihmingthanga trained at Liverpool's youth academy at Kirkby after impressing the youth coaches at DSK's LFC academy in India.

NorthEast United
Even though Chhangte signed his first professional contract with DSK Shivajians, he was loaned to NorthEast United FC to make his professional debut in the 2016 Indian Super League season. He made just one appearance for the club, that was against Mumbai City FC as a substitute for Robin Gurung on 5 November 2016 in the 74th minute of the match, which ended in a 0–1 defeat for NorthEast United. After NorthEast United failed to qualify for the finals, Chhangte returned to DSK Shivajians.

DSK Shivajians 
Chhangte returned to DSK Shivajians after his loan term at NorthEast United for the 2016-17 I-League season. He played his debut match for the club against Mumbai FC on 8 January 2017, which DSK ended up losing 1–0. He scored his first professional goal and debut goal for DSK Shivajians on 11 March against Mumbai FC in the second match against them that season, which they won in a huge score of 5–0, where Chhangte scored his goal in the 67th minute of the game after coming in as a substitute for Sumeet Passi. Chhangte then played his last match for DSK on 20 April against Minerva Punjab FC, which ended in a high scoring 4–4 draw.

Delhi Dynamos
For 2017–18 Indian Super League season he was picked by Delhi Dynamos (current Odisha FC) from the draft for 27 lakh rupees. He scored on his debut match for the club on 22 November 2017 on the club's first match of the season against FC Pune City, which they ended up winning 2–3 after final whistle. Chhangte scored his second goal of the season on 14 January 2018 in a 2–0 victory over Bengaluru FC. He scored his third goal of the season against Mumbai City FC on 27 February, which they emerged as winners with a huge of score 5–1, where Chhangte scored the last goal of the match. Chhangte thus ended his 2017–18 season with three goals. Chhangte stayed at the club for the 2018–19 Indian Super League season. He played his first match of the season against Pune City in the club's opening match of the season on 3 October 2018, which ended in a 1–1 draw. He scored his first goal of the season against Jamshedpur FC on 4 November, which ended in a 2–2 draw. Chhangte scored his second goal of the season on 8 November in a 3–2 defeat against FC Goa. He scored again on 3 December against Mumbai City FC, where he opened the scoresheet in the 3rd minute of the game, which eventually turned out to be a defeat for Delhi, as they conceded four goals later, resulting in a 2–4 defeat. Chhangte scored his fourth goal of the season on 12 December in 2–1 defeat over Jamshedpur FC. Chhangte scored his last goal of the season and last goal for Delhi against Pune City on 24 February 2019, which ended in a 1–3 victory for Delhi. Chhangte ended his last campaign with Delhi Dynamos with five goals in his name from that season.

Trials with Viking FK 
While being at Delhi Dynamos, Chhangte went on for trials with Norwegian club, Viking FK for 10 days. After leaving Delhi Dynamos, he was called up for a second trial with the Norwegian club, after failing in his first stint. He later returned from Norway to India after failing to materialize his second stint into a permanent deal.

Chennaiyin
After Chhangte failed in his second extended trial with Viking FK, on 30 August 2019, it was announced that Chhangte had joined Chennaiyin FC from Delhi Dynamos on a two year contract. Chhangte played his debut match for the club on 23 October 2019 in a 3–0 defeat against FC Goa. He scored his debut goal for the club in the Southern Derby against Kerala Blasters FC on 20 December, which they won 3–1 after the final whistle. He scored his second of the season on 23 January 2020 in a 4–1 victory over Jamshedpur FC. He scored a brace in the second match of the season against the South Indian rivals, Kerala Blasters FC on 1 February, which they won with a score of 3–6 in one of the high scoring matches in the history of the Indian Super League. Chhangte scored his next on 25 February against NorthEast United, where he scored the equaliser in the injury time, thereby taking the match to a 2–2 draw. Chennaiyin had a staggering campaign, as they went on to qualify for the knockout stages of the 2019–20 Indian Super League season. Chennaiyin FC met FC Goa in the semi finals. Chhangte played in the first leg of the semi final match against FC Goa on 29 February, where he scored a goal, resulting in the 4–1 victory of Chennaiyin in the first leg. Chhangte scored again in the second leg on 7 March, which they lost 4–2, but qualified through to the final due to the aggregate score of 6–5. He started in the final against ATK on 14 March, which they ended up losing 3–1. Chhangte had a standout season, as he scored seven goal throughout the campaign, thus becoming the second top Indian goalscorer of the season, behind Sunil Chhetri. Chhangte played his first match of the 2020–21 Indian Super League season on 24 November 2021 in a 1–2 victory over Jamshedpur FC. He scored his first goal of the season on 26 December 2020 against East Bengal, where he opened the scoresheet of match, which ended in a 2–2 draw. Chhangte found the net again in the match against FC Goa on 13 February 2021, which ended in a 2–2 draw after a late goal by FC Goa. He scored a brace against NorthEast United on 18 February in the next matchday, which ended in a dramatic 3–3 draw. Chhangte thus ended his 2020–21 campaign with four goals in his name.

International career
Lallianzuala represented India U19s for the 2016 AFC U-19 Championship qualification, appearing three times in a disappointing campaign. He was called up for Indian squad for to take part in the 2015 SAFF Championship. He made his debut for India on 25 December 2015 against Sri Lanka in the tournament, where he started as a substitute for Robin Singh in 77th minute of the match, which India won 2–0. He became 502/9 player to represent the India national team. On 27 December, Chhangte scored his debut goal for India, as he scored a brace in their 4–1 victory over Nepal in the same competition. By those goals, he became the then third youngest goalscorer for India's senior national team at the age of 18 years 140 days after Jerry Zirsanga at 16 years 311 days and Baichung Bhutia at the age of 18 years 90 days.

He represented India in the 2018 SAFF Championship, where he netted one goal after a 1−0 lead against Sri Lanka on 5 September 2018, helping India to win their first group match by 2−0. Chhangte  was called up for the Indian squad to take part in the 2019 Intercontinental Cup. He scored a goal in India's second match against North Korea on 13 July 2019 while India was trailing by 0-3, which India lost 2−5 after the final whistle. After his impressive form in the ISL, he was included in the squad for the 2022 FIFA World Cup qualifiers.

Personal life 
Chhangte was born in Lunglei, Mizoram. His father was a teacher. He began to play football since grade one. His brother CVL Remtluanga is a footballer, who currently plays for the reserve side of Odisha FC. Chhangte's favorites in football are; former England international, Frank Lampard and current Portugal international, Cristiano Ronaldo.

Style of play 
Chhangte is a fast player, who has an incredible top speed of 35.80 km/hr. He is called 'Mizo Flash' due to his pace. He is a versatile player with perfect positioning and dribbling ability who exactly knows how to finish a goal. His  skills and vision on the pitch make him one of the most important players for India.

Career statistics

Club

International

Honours 

India U23
 South Asian Games silver medal: 2016

India
 SAFF Championship: 2015; runner-up: 2018
 King's Cup third place: 2019

Chennaiyin
 Indian Super League runner-up: 2019–20

Mumbai City
Indian Super League League Winners Shield: 2022–23
 Durand Cup runner-up: 2022

Individual
 Durand Cup Golden Boot: 2022
 Indian Super League Hero of the Month: January 2023

References

External links 
 
 Lallianzuala Chhangte at All India Football Federation
 Lallianzuala Chhangte at Indian Super League

1997 births
Living people
People from Lunglei
Indian footballers
Footballers from Mizoram
Association football forwards
India youth international footballers
India international footballers
Indian Super League players
I-League players
NorthEast United FC players
DSK Shivajians FC players
Odisha FC players
Chennaiyin FC players
Mumbai City FC players
South Asian Games silver medalists for India
South Asian Games medalists in football